De Lux is an American post-disco musical duo from Los Angeles, consisting of Sean Guerin and Isaac Franco. Guerin and Franco began creating music together at the age of 15. , the group is signed to Innovative Leisure. The band released their first album, Voyage, in 2014. It was praised by Paul Lester as not having "a bad track". In 2015, Generation was released and the group promoted the album through appearances in the Coachella Valley Music and Arts Festival and Panorama Fest in New York City.

Their song "Moments" was featured in the 2015 film Paper Towns.

Discography

Studio albums
 Voyage (2014)
 Generation (2015)
 More Disco Songs About Love (2018)
 Do You Need A Release? (2022)

Extended plays
 More Disco Covers About Love (2018)
 In Betweens (2020)
 Uneven (2021)

Collaborations
 "In These Fine Times" (with Classixx) (2016)
 "Power Struggle" (with Hanni El Khatib) (2019)

References 

American musical duos
American post-disco music groups
Musical groups from Los Angeles